North Haven railway station is located on the Outer Harbor line. Situated in the north-western Adelaide suburb of North Haven, it is 20.5 kilometres from Adelaide station.

History 

North Haven opened on 13 September 1981 replacing Yerlo railway station.

Until just after Midlunga, the train line is double tracked. Osborne, North Haven and Outer Harbour are all serviced by a single track which means only one train is permitted in that section at the same time.

Services by platform

References

Rails Through Swamp and Sand – A History of the Port Adelaide Railway.  M. Thompson pub. Port Dock Station Railway Museum (1988)

External links

Railway stations in Adelaide
Railway stations in Australia opened in 1981
Lefevre Peninsula